Birkenfeld is a town in Rhineland-Palatinate, Germany.

Birkenfeld (lit. "birch field") may also refer to:

Birkenfeld (district), a district in Rhineland-Palatinate
Birkenfeld (Verbandsgemeinde), a Verbandsgemeinde in Rhineland-Palatinate
Birkenfeld, Bavaria, a municipality in Bavaria, Germany
Birkenfeld (Enz), a municipality in Baden-Württemberg, Germany
Birkenfeld, Oregon, an unincorporated community in Columbia County, Oregon

People with the surname
Brad Birkenfeld, a whistle blower in the UBS bank scandal